PayPal Holdings, Inc. is an American multinational financial technology company operating an online payments system in the majority of countries that support online money transfers, and serves as an electronic alternative to traditional paper methods such as checks and money orders. The company operates as a payment processor for online vendors, auction sites and many other commercial users, for which it charges a fee.

Established in 1998 as Confinity, PayPal went public through an IPO in 2002. It became a wholly owned subsidiary of eBay later that year, valued at $1.5 billion. In 2015 eBay spun off PayPal to its shareholders, and PayPal became an independent company again.
The company was ranked 143rd on the 2022 Fortune 500 of the largest United States corporations by revenue.

History

Early history 
PayPal was originally established by Max Levchin, Peter Thiel, and Luke Nosek in December 1998 as Confinity, a company that developed security software for hand-held devices. Having had no success with that business model, however, it switched its focus to a digital wallet. The first version of the PayPal electronic payments system was launched in 1999.

In March 2000, Confinity merged with x.com, an online financial services company founded in March 1999 by Elon Musk, Harris Fricker, Christopher Payne, and Ed Ho. Musk was optimistic about the future success of the money transfer business Confinity was developing. Musk and Bill Harris, then-president and CEO of X.com, disagreed about the potential future success of the money transfer business and Harris left the company in May 2000. In October of that year, Musk decided that X.com would terminate its other internet banking operations and focus on payments. That same month, Elon Musk was replaced by Peter Thiel as CEO of X.com, which was renamed PayPal in June 2001 and went public in 2002. PayPal's IPO listed under the ticker PYPL at $13 per share and generated over $61 million.

eBay subsidiary (2002–2014) 

Shortly after PayPal's IPO, the company was acquired by eBay on October 3, 2002, for $1.5 billion in eBay stock. More than 70 percent of all eBay auctions accepted PayPal payments, and roughly 1 in 4 closed auction listings were transacted via PayPal. PayPal became the default payment method used by the majority of eBay users, and the service competed with eBay's subsidiary Billpoint, as well as Citibank's c2it, Yahoo!'s PayDirect, and Google Checkout.

In 2005, PayPal acquired the VeriSign payment solution to provide added security support. In 2007, PayPal announced a partnership with MasterCard, which led to the development and launch of the PayPal Secure Card service, a software that allows customers to make payments on websites that do not accept PayPal directly. By the end of 2007, the company generated $1.8 billion in revenue.

In January 2008, PayPal acquired Fraud Sciences, a privately held Israeli start-up that developed online risk tools, for $169 million. In November 2008, the company acquired Bill Me Later, an online transactional credit company.

By 2010, PayPal had over 100 million active user accounts in 190 markets through 25 different currencies. In July 2011, fourteen alleged members of the Anonymous hacktivist group were charged with attempting to disrupt PayPal's operations. The denial of service attacks occurred in December 2010, after PayPal stopped processing donations to WikiLeaks. On 5 December  2013, 13 of the PayPal 14 pleaded guilty to misdemeanor and felony charges related to the attacks.

The company continued to build its Merchant Services division, providing e-payments for retailers on eBay. In 2011, PayPal announced that it would begin moving its business offline so that customers can make payments via PayPal in stores. 

In August 2012, the company announced its partnership with Discover Card to allow PayPal payments to be made at any of the seven million stores in the Discover network.

In 2013, PayPal acquired IronPearl, a Palo Alto startup offering engagement software, and Braintree, a Chicago-based payment gateway, to further product development and mobile services. In June 2014 David Marcus announced he was leaving his role as PayPal President; Marcus joined PayPal in August 2011 after its acquisition of Zong, of which he was the founder and CEO. David Marcus succeeded Scott Thompson as president, who left the role to join Yahoo. PayPal announced that Marcus would be succeeded by Dan Schulman, who previously served as CEO of Virgin Mobile and Executive vice president of American Express.

Spin-off from eBay (2014–present) 

It was announced on September 30, 2014, that eBay would spin off PayPal into a separate publicly traded company, a move demanded in 2013 by activist hedge fund magnate Carl Icahn. The spin-off was completed on July 18, 2015. Dan Schulman is the current president and CEO, with former eBay CEO John Donahoe serving as chairman. On January 31, 2018, eBay announced that "After the existing eBay-PayPal agreement ends in 2020, PayPal will remain a payment option for shoppers on eBay, but it won't be prominently featured ahead of debit and credit card options as it is today. PayPal will cease to process card payments for eBay at that time." The company will "instead begin working with Amsterdam-based Adyen".

On July 1, 2015, PayPal announced that it was acquiring digital money transfer company Xoom Corporation. PayPal spent $25 a share in cash to acquire the publicly traded Xoom, or about $1.09 billion. The deal was closed in the fourth quarter of 2015. The move strengthened PayPal’s international business, giving it access to Xoom’s 1.3 million active U.S. customers that sent about $7 billion in the 12 months ending on March 31, to people in 37 countries.

On September 1, 2015, PayPal launched its peer-to-peer payment platform "PayPal.Me", a service that allows users to send a custom link to request funds via text, email, or other messaging platforms. Custom links are set to be structured as PayPal.me/username/amount requested.  PayPal.Me was launched in 18 countries including the United States, United Kingdom, Germany, Australia, Canada, Russia, Turkey, France, Italy, Spain, Poland, Sweden, Belgium, Norway, Denmark, Netherlands, Austria and Switzerland. PayPal had 170 million users, as of September 2015, and the focus of PayPal.Me was to create a mobile-first user experience that enables faster payment sharing than PayPal's traditional tools.

On May 17, 2018, PayPal agreed to purchase Swedish payment processor iZettle for $2.2 billion. This was PayPal's largest acquisition until late November 2019 and the company claims that it is the in-store expertise and digital marketing strength that will complement its own online and mobile payment services.

On March 19, 2019, PayPal announced its partnership with Instagram as part of the company's new checkout feature, "Checkout on Instagram".

In June 2019, PayPal reported that Chief Operating Officer Bill Ready would be leaving the company at the end of the year. In December 2019, Google announced that Ready would become the new commerce chief.

On January 6, 2020, PayPal acquired Honey for over $4 billion. This is PayPal's largest acquisition to date, and its most recent. It more recently signed a deal with NBCUniversal.

In January 2021, PayPal became the first foreign operator with 100% control of a payment platform in China, gaining an advanced position in the local online payment market.

In an international survey conducted in March 2021 by Morning Consult, PayPal was found to be the second most trusted brand globally.

On October 20, 2021, Bloomberg reported that PayPal is interested in acquiring Pinterest, with a potential price around $70 a share, there’s no certainty the talks will lead to an agreement.

In June 2022, Shopify partnered with PayPal to offer Shopify Payments to merchants in France.

In February 2023, PayPal announced layoffs for 2,000 of its workers, or 7% of its total workforce.

It was reported in February 2023, that CEO Dan Schulman will step away from his role by the end of 2023. Schulman will continue to serve on the board of directors after vacating the position.

Acquisitions

Finances 
The fiscal year for Paypal is from January 1 to December 31.  For fiscal year 2019, Paypal reported earnings of US$2.459 billion, with an annual revenue of $17.772 billion, an increase of 15% over the previous fiscal cycle. PayPal's shares traded at over $108 per share, and its market capitalization was valued at over $127.58 billion in December 2019.

The COVID-19 pandemic has accelerated the growth of digital payment platforms, including PayPal, at the expense of the traditional banking sector. As a result, Paypal has seen an increase in its stock to up to 78% in 2020 as of October. In addition, total payment volume has increased 29% amounting to $220 billion increasing positive investor sentiment.

Offices 

PayPal's corporate headquarters are located in the North San Jose Innovation District of San Jose, California, at North First Street campus. The company's operations center is located in La Vista, Nebraska, which was opened in 1999. Since July 2007, PayPal has operated across the European Union as a Luxembourg-based bank. The PayPal European headquarters are located in Luxembourg and the international headquarters are in Singapore. PayPal opened a technology center in Scottsdale, Arizona in 2006, and a software development center in Chennai, India in 2007. In October 2007, PayPal opened a data service office on the north side of Austin, Texas, and also opened a second operations center in La Vista, Nebraska that same year. In 2011, joining similar customer support operations located in Berlin, Germany; Chandler, Arizona; Dublin and Dundalk, Ireland; Omaha, Nebraska; and Shanghai, China; PayPal opened a second customer support center in Kuala Lumpur, Malaysia, and began the hiring process. In 2014, PayPal opened a new global center of operations in Kuala Lumpur.

Services 

PayPal's services allow people to make financial transactions online by granting the ability to transfer funds electronically between individuals and businesses. Through PayPal, users can send or receive payments for online auctions on websites like eBay, purchase or sell goods and services, or donate money or receive donations. It is not necessary to have a PayPal account to use the company's services. PayPal account users can set currency conversion option in account settings.

The PayPal app is available online or at the iTunes App Store and Google Play.  One year after acquiring Braintree, PayPal introduced its "One Touch" service, which allows users to pay with a one-touch option on participating merchants websites or apps.

In 2007, PayPal acquired the online credit product Bill Me Later, Inc., which has since been rebranded as PayPal Credit and provided services for Comenity Capital Bank, the lender of PayPal Credit accounts. Founded in 2000, Bill Me Later is headquartered in Timonium, Maryland. PayPal Credit offers shoppers access to an instant online revolving line of credit at thousands of vendors that accept PayPal, subject to credit approval. PayPal Credit allows consumers to shop online in much the same way as they would with a traditional credit card. The rebranding of Bill Me Later as PayPal Credit also means that consumers can use PayPal Credit to fund transactions virtually anywhere PayPal is accepted. In 2015 PayPal agreed that PayPal Credit would pay a $25 million fine to settle a complaint filed in Federal Court by the Consumer Financial Protection Bureau.

From 2009 to 2016, PayPal operated Student Accounts, allowing parents to set up a student account, transfer money into it, and obtain a debit card for student use. The program provided tools to teach how to spend money wisely and take responsibility for actions.  PayPal discontinued Student Accounts in August 2016.

In November 2009, PayPal partially opened its platform, allowing other services to get access to more APIs and to use its infrastructure in order to enable peer-to-peer online transactions.

On November 28, 2011, PayPal reported Black Friday brought record mobile engagement, including a 538% increase in global mobile payment volume when compared with Black Friday 2010.

In 2012, the company launched "PayPal Here", a small business mobile payment system that includes a combination of a free mobile app and a small card-reader that plugs into a smart phone.

PayPal launched an updated app for iOS and Android in 2013 that expanded its mobile app capabilities by allowing users to search for local shops and restaurants that accept PayPal payments, order ahead at participating venues, and access their PayPal Credit accounts (formerly known as Bill Me Later).

On October 21, 2020, PayPal announced a new service allowing customers to use cryptocurrencies to shop at 26 million merchants on the network starting in 2021. Paypal has been using Paxos Trust to provide the back end infrastructure allowing users to manage and trade cryptocurrencies in accordance to data privacy rules and financial regulations. Paxos has been in charge of acquiring the necessary regulatory approvals for Paypal to facilitate cryptocurrency assets. As part of the announcement, PayPal secured the first conditional cryptocurrency license from the New York State Department of Financial Services, which will allow customers to purchase cryptocurrencies such as Bitcoin, Litecoin, Ethereum, and Bitcoin Cash. In March 2022, PayPal introduced a flat-fee structure for cryptocurrency transactions under $200; transactions over $200 incur a 1.8% fee for purchases or sales up to $1,000, and 1.5% for any transaction amount greater than $1,000.

, PayPal operates in 202 markets and has 426 million active, registered accounts. PayPal allows customers to send, receive, and hold funds in 25 currencies worldwide.

Business model evolution 
PayPal's success in users and volumes was the product of a three-phase strategy described by former eBay CEO Meg Whitman: "First, PayPal focused on expanding its service among eBay users in the US. Second, we began expanding PayPal to eBay's international sites. And third, we started to build PayPal's business off eBay."

Phase 1 

In the first phase, payment volumes were coming mostly from the eBay auction website. The system was very attractive to auction sellers, most of which were individuals or small businesses that were unable to accept credit cards, and for consumers as well. In fact, many sellers could not qualify for a credit card Merchant account because they lacked a commercial credit history. The service also appealed to auction buyers because they could fund PayPal accounts using credit cards or bank account balances, without divulging credit card numbers to unknown sellers. PayPal employed an aggressive marketing campaign to accelerate its growth, depositing $10 in new users' PayPal accounts.

Phase 2 

Until 2000, PayPal's strategy was to earn interest on funds in PayPal accounts. However, most recipients of PayPal credits withdrew funds immediately. Also, many senders funded their payments using credit cards, which cost PayPal roughly 2% of payment value per transaction.

To solve this problem, PayPal tailored its product to cater more to business accounts. Instead of relying on interests earned from deposited funds, PayPal started relying on earnings from service charges. They offered seller protection to PayPal account holders, provided that they comply with reimbursement policies. For example, PayPal merchants are either required to retain a traceable proof of shipping to a confirmed address or to provide a signed receipt for items valued over $750.

Phase 3 

After fine-tuning PayPal's business model and increasing its domestic and international penetration on eBay, PayPal started its off-eBay strategy. This was based on developing stronger growth in active users by adding users across multiple platforms, despite the slowdown in on-eBay growth and low-single-digit user growth on the eBay site. A late 2003 reorganization created a new business unit within PayPal—Merchant Services—to provide payment solutions to small and large e-commerce merchants outside the eBay auction community. Starting in the second half of 2004, PayPal Merchant Services unveiled several initiatives to enroll online merchants outside the eBay auction community, including:

 Lowering its transaction fee for high-volume merchants from 2.2% to 1.9% (while increasing the monthly transaction volume required to qualify for the lowest fee to $100,000)
 Encouraging its users to recruit non-eBay merchants by increasing its referral bonus to a maximum of $1,000 (versus the previous $100 cap)
 Persuading credit card gateway providers, including CyberSource and Retail Decisions USA, to include PayPal among their offerings to online merchants.
 Hiring a new sales force to acquire large merchants such as Dell, Apple's iTunes, and Yahoo! Stores, which hosted thousands of online merchants
 Reducing fees for online music purchases and other "micropayments"
 Launching PayPal Mobile, which allowed users to make payments using text messaging on their cell phones

Global reach 

PayPal can be used in more than 200 countries/regions.

Different countries have different conditions: Send only (Package Service allows sending only, valid in 97 countries), PayPal Zero (package suggests the possibility of enrollment, entry, and withdrawal of funds in foreign currency, but the user can not hold the balance PayPal account, operates in 18 countries), SRW Send – Receive – Withdrawal (the possibility of enrollment, input-output and the ability to keep your PayPal account balance in the currency and to transfer to the card when the user sees fit, operates in 41 countries) and Local Currency (SRW plus opportunity to conduct transactions in the local currency, 21 countries).

China 

In July 2017, PayPal announced a partnership with Baidu, to allow the Chinese firm’s 100 million mobile wallet users to make payments to PayPal’s 17 million merchants through the Baidu service.

Crimea 

In January 2015, PayPal ceased operations in Crimea in compliance with international sanctions against Russia and Crimea.

India 

As of March 2011, PayPal has made changes to the User Agreement for Indian users to comply with Reserve Bank of India regulations. The per transaction limit had been set to USD $3,000, since October 14, 2011. However, on July 29, 2013, PayPal increased the per transaction limit to USD $10,000. This brings the per transaction limit for India in line with the restrictions imposed by PayPal in most other countries.

PayPal has disabled sending and receiving personal payments in India, thus forcing all recipients to pay a transaction fee.

PayPal plans to make India an incubation center for the company's employee engagement policies. In 2012, PayPal hired 120 people for its offices in Chennai and Bengaluru.

On 8 November 2017, PayPal launched domestic operations under PayPal Payments Private Limited and now provides digital payment solutions for merchants and customers in India. As of 2020, Paypal supports the domestic card system RuPay and is planning to further integrate Unified Payment Interface (UPI) in collaboration with National Payments Corporation of India (NPCI). PayPal now has the largest global engineering team in India outside of the US, which is spread over Bengaluru, Chennai and Hyderabad.

Israel and Palestinian Territories 

PayPal is available in Israel but is not available in the Palestinian territories. Nor can Palestinians working in the West Bank or Gaza access it but Israelis living in settlements in the West Bank can use PayPal. This decision has prompted Palestinian tech companies to seek a policy change from PayPal.

Japan 

In late March 2010, new Japanese banking regulations forced PayPal Japan to suspend the ability of personal account holders registered in Japan from sending or receiving money between individuals and as a result are now subject to PayPal's business fees on all transactions.

Pakistan 

In Pakistan, users can use Xoom, a money transfer service owned by PayPal. In October 2018, Pakistan's government used Xoom to help crowdsource funds for the purpose of building two dams.

The government of Pakistan is trying to convince PayPal administration to launch its service in the country, but PayPal is not ready to introduce its services there.

Turkey 

Eight years after the company first started operating in the country, Paypal ceased operations in Turkey on 6 June 2016 when Turkish financial regulator BDDK denied it a payment license. The regulators had demanded that PayPal's data centers be located inside Turkey to facilitate compliance with government and court orders to block content and to generate tax revenue. PayPal said that the closure will affect tens of thousands of businesses and hundreds of thousands of consumers in Turkey.

Sri Lanka 

In January 2017, the PayPal team was scheduled to visit Sri Lanka in mid-January to re-establish links. In Sri Lanka as of 2021, PayPal can be used only to send money.

Russia 
In March 2022, PayPal suspended all activities in Russia due to 2022 Russian invasion of Ukraine.

Ukraine 
In March 2022, PayPal expanded its services for Ukrainian accounts,  allowing them to send and receive money from friends and family. Previously, PayPal users in Ukraine could only send money internationally from their accounts, not receive it.

Kenya 
In 2018, PayPal and Safaricom collaborated to enable Kenyans to perform MPESA transactions by leveraging on the latter's mobile money service

Indonesia 

In 30 July 2022, Kominfo blocked PayPal due PSE regulation. Many PayPal users in Indonesia are concerned, as some of them stored lot of their money in this platform. The service had been temporarily unblocked for 5 days for users to withdraw their money from the platform. The main reason is that PayPal have yet to get a permit from Bank Indonesia and Otoritas Jasa keuangan. PayPal had been unblocked in 3 August 2022 after registering.

PayPal Giving Fund 

PayPal Giving Fund is a registered charity supported by PayPal that streamlines donations to non-profit organizations.

Digital marketing with PayPal 

PayPal launches different marketing activities in various channels and emphasizes that consumers can use it in different ways. PayPal's marketing includes TV commercials, outdoor advertising, Facebook, and display advertisement.

PayPal provides free analytics to traders about the ways that consumers utilize online payments. Through the free tracking service, PayPal assists traders in targeting consumers. PayPal's code gathers the consumer information, which can be installed on the trader's website. Both PayPal and traders benefit from the free service.

PayPal partners with Synchrony Financial to provide the PayPal Cashback Mastercard, which offers 2% cash back to customers who use the card to make purchases both online and in physical stores. PayPal’s cashback financial service promotes the number of potential customers.

Apple allows PayPal as a mode of payment for App Store, Apple Music, iTunes, and Apple Books. PayPal can increase usage of Apple platforms. In addition, PayPal receives revenue from Apple services, especially from the App Store.  Customers can use PayPal to make purchases by linking their PayPal accounts to their Apple IDs.

Regulation 

Thiel, a founder of PayPal, has stated that PayPal is not a bank because it does not engage in fractional-reserve banking. Rather, PayPal's funds that have not been disbursed are kept in commercial interest-bearing checking accounts.

In the United States, PayPal is licensed as a money transmitter, on a state-by-state basis. But state laws vary, as do their definitions of banks, narrow banks, money services businesses, and money transmitters.  Although PayPal is not classified as a bank, the company is subject to some of the rules and regulations governing the financial industry, including Regulation E consumer protections and the USA PATRIOT Act. The most analogous regulatory source of law for PayPal transactions comes from peer-to-peer (P2P) payments using credit and debit cards. Ordinarily, a credit card transaction, specifically the relationship between the issuing bank and the cardholder, is governed by the Truth in Lending Act (TILA) 15 U.S.C. §§ 1601-1667f as implemented by Regulation Z, 12 C.F.R. 226, (TILA/Z). TILA/Z requires specific procedures for billing errors, dispute resolution, and limits cardholder liability for unauthorized charges. Similarly, the legal relationship between a debit cardholder and the issuing bank is regulated by the Electronic Funds Transfer Act (EFTA) 15 U.S.C. §§ 1693-1693r, as implemented by Regulation E, 12 C.F.R. 205, (EFTA/E). EFTA/E is directed at consumer protection and provides strict error resolution procedures. However, because PayPal is a payment intermediary and not otherwise regulated directly, TILA/Z and EFTA/E do not operate exactly as written once the credit/debit card transaction occurs via PayPal. Basically, unless a PayPal transaction is funded with a credit card, the consumer has no recourse in the event of fraud by the seller.

In 2008, PayPal Europe was granted a Luxembourg banking license, which, under European Union law, allows it to conduct banking business throughout the EU. It is therefore regulated as a bank by Luxembourg's banking supervisory authority, the Commission de Surveillance du Secteur Financier (CSSF). All of the company's European accounts were transferred to PayPal's bank in Luxembourg in July 2007. Prior to this move, PayPal had been registered in the United Kingdom as PayPal (Europe) Ltd, an entity which was licensed as an Electronic Money Issuer with the UK's Financial Services Authority (FSA) from 2004. This ceased in 2007, when the company moved to Luxembourg.

In India, as of January 2010, PayPal has no cross-border money transfer authorization. In The New York Times article "India's Central Bank Stops Some PayPal Services", Reserve Bank of India spokesman Alpana Killawalla stated: "Providers of cross-border money transfer service need prior authorization from the Reserve Bank under the Payment and Settlement Systems Act, PayPal does not have our authorization." PayPal is not listed in the "Certificates of Authorisation issued by the Reserve Bank of India under the Payment and Settlement Systems Act, 2007 for Setting up and Operating Payment System in India".
PaisaPay is an Indian sister service to PayPal. It is also owned by eBay. PaisaPay makes possible payments from abroad by PayPal account holders to Indian sellers on eBay.in.

In Australia, PayPal is licensed as an authorised deposit-taking institution (ADI) and is thus subject to Australian banking laws and regulations.

In Singapore, PayPal holds a stored value facility that does not require the approval of the Monetary Authority of Singapore.

Safety and protection policies 

The PayPal Buyer Protection Policy states that customers may file a buyer complaint for not receiving an item or if the purchased item was significantly not as described. The customer can open a dispute within 180 days from the date of payment and escalate it to a claim within 20 days from opening the dispute. Buyers using a credit card  might get a refund via chargeback from their credit-card company. However, in the UK, where such a purchaser is entitled to specific statutory protections (that the credit card company is a second party to the purchase and is therefore equally liable in law if the other party defaults or goes into liquidation) under Section 75 Consumer Credit Act 1974, the purchaser loses this legal protection if the card payment is processed via PayPal.

Also, the Financial Ombudsman Service (for the U.K.) position is that section 75 protection does not apply where PayPal or any eMoney service becomes involved in the credit card transaction. This leaves consumers with no recourse to pursue their complaint with the Financial Ombudsman Service. They would only have recourse in the courts, but in any event they cannot because PayPal is incorporated in Luxembourg and, since the UK has left the EU, is now no longer within the jurisdiction of any UK Courts. The key issues that determine the applicability of section 75 are identified very clearly in Office of Fair Trading v Lloyds TSB Bank Plc and others [2006] EWCA Civ 268 7 and the Bank of Scotland v Alfred Truman (a firm) [2005] [EWHC] 583 (QB). This is a legal authority that section 75 protection does exist where one has paid on a credit card for a product, via an eMoney service.

According to PayPal, it protects sellers in a limited fashion via the Seller Protection Policy. In general, the Seller Protection Policy is intended to protect the seller from certain kinds of chargebacks or complaints if the seller meets certain conditions, including proof of delivery to the buyer. PayPal states the Seller Protection Policy is "designed to protect sellers against claims by buyers of unauthorized payments and against claims of non-receipt of any merchandise". The policy includes a list of "Exclusions" which itself includes "Intangible goods", "Claims for receipt of goods 'not as described, and "Total reversals over the annual limit". There are also other restrictions in terms of the sale itself, the payment method and the destination country the item is shipped to (simply having a tracking mechanism is not sufficient to guarantee the Seller Protection Policy is in effect). The PayPal Seller Protection Policy does not provide the additional consumer protection afforded by UK consumer legislation (most notably the Consumer Rights Act 2015) and in addition, it cannot be enforced in the Courts because PayPal operates from Luxembourg, outside all three of the UK legal jurisdictions.

Security

Security token 

In early 2006, PayPal introduced an optional security key as an additional precaution against fraud. A user account tied to a security key has a modified login process. Account-holders enter their login ID and password as normal, but are then prompted to enter a six-digit code provided by a credit card sized hardware security key or a text message sent to the account holder's mobile phone. For convenience, users may append the code generated by the hardware key to their password in the login screen. This way they are not prompted for it on another page. This method is required for some services, such as when using PayPal through the eBay application on iPhone.

This two-factor authentication is intended to make it difficult for an account to be compromised by a malicious third party without access to the physical security key, although it does not prevent the so-called Man in the Browser (MITB) attacks. However, the user (or malicious third party) can alternatively authenticate by providing the credit card or bank account number listed on their account. Thus, the PayPal implementation does not offer the security of true two-factor authentication.

MTAN 

It is also possible to use a mobile phone to receive an mTAN (Mobile Transaction Authentication Number) via SMS. Use of a security code that is sent to the account holder's mobile phone is currently free.

Fraud 

As early as 2001, PayPal had substantial problems with online fraud, especially international hackers who were hacking into PayPal accounts and transferring small amounts of money out of multiple accounts. Standard solutions for merchant and banking fraud might use government criminal sanctions to pursue the fraudsters. But with PayPal losing millions of dollars each month to fraud while experiencing difficulties with using the FBI to pursue cases of international fraud, PayPal developed a fraud monitoring system to detect potentially fraudulent transactions. This development of fraud monitoring software at PayPal led Peter Thiel to create Palantir, a big-data security company whose original mission was to "reduce terrorism while preserving civil liberties."

150,000 PayPal cards frozen 

In 2015, 150,000 Spanish cardholders had their funds frozen in an apparent fraud case involving a PayPal service provider, Younique Money, which was the de facto administrator of the cards. Previously, PayPal had charged €15 to all its card users without authorization (150,000 users). As of March 2015, most funds had not been returned.

Criticism and controversies 

In 2003, PayPal voluntarily ceased serving as a payment intermediary between gambling websites and their online customers. At the time of this cessation, it was the largest payment processor for online gambling transactions. In 2010, PayPal resumed accepting such transactions, but only in those countries where online gambling is legal, and only for sites which are properly licensed to operate in said jurisdictions.

Since at least 2005, PayPal has maintained an Acceptable Use policy which disallows "transactions involving ... items that are considered obscene ... [or] certain sexually oriented materials or services."  Their enforcement of this policy has been a constant source of controversy between PayPal and people within or related to the sex industry.  In 2014, PayPal notified subscription service provider Patreon that it was moving to cease integration with Patreon as a platform as the result of Patreon permitting "adult content" on their platform.  Patreon subsequently removed access to PayPal services for creators who produced sexual content.

If an account is subject to fraud or unauthorized use, PayPal puts the "Limited Access" designation on the account. PayPal has had several notable cases in which the company has frozen the account of users such as Richard Kyanka, owner of the website Something Awful, in September 2005, Cryptome in March 2010, or April Winchell, the owner of Regretsy, in December 2011. The account was reinstated, and PayPal apologized and donated to her cause.

In September 2010, PayPal froze the account of the Minecraft developer, Markus Persson. Persson stated publicly that he had not received a clear explanation of why the account was frozen, and that PayPal was threatening to keep the money if they found anything wrong. His account contained around €600,000.

PayPal's partner MasterCard ceased taking donations to WikiLeaks in 2010, and PayPal also suspended, and later permanently restricted, payments to the website after the U.S. State Department said WikiLeaks was engaged in illegal activities. Online supporters and activists retaliated by subjecting PayPal and MasterCard, along with other companies, to coordinated cyber attacks.

In February 2011, PayPal unbanned the account of a website that supports Iraq War resisters after it had enough information to fulfill its know your customer guidelines. The Chelsea Manning Support Network claimed the backdown was a reaction to a petition to the company to reinstate the account.

In May 2013, PayPal declined to pay a reward offered in its Bug Bounty Program to a 17-year-old German student who had reported a cross-site scripting flaw on its site. The company wrote that the vulnerability had been previously reported, and chastised the youth for disclosing the issue to the public, but, uniquely, sent him a "Letter of recognition" for the discovery.

In August 2013, entrepreneurs who had used PayPal to collect the funds they raised on crowdfunding platforms like Kickstarter and Indiegogo reported difficulty in being able to withdraw the money. Victims included Ouya, GlassUp (a rival to Google Glass), and Mailpile.

In May 2014, PayPal blocked the account of a Russian human rights organisation "RosUznik", which supported political prisoners arrested at Bolotnaya Square.

As of January 2015, a class-action lawsuit against PayPal has been filed in Israel, claiming that they arbitrarily froze accounts and held funds for up to 180 days without paying interest and thereby directly profited from it. In the examples given in the lawsuit, PayPal had received complaints against small vendors which were later resolved, but the PayPal account was closed. The lawsuit requests that PayPal be declared a monopoly and thus regulated accordingly.

In April 2015, The Guardian reported that PayPal had blocked the account of London-based human rights group Justice for Iran.

In May 2015, PayPal blocked an account intended to raise money for the distribution of Boris Nemtsov's report "Putin. War". The explanation by PayPal was that "PayPal does not offer the opportunity to use its system for collecting funds to finance the activities of political parties or for political aims in Russia", though PayPal's Acceptable Use Policy does not mention financing for political goals. Non-governmental organization Freedom House issued a statement that "PayPal should immediately lift this ban, to help, rather than hinder, press freedom in Russia."

By 2016, ConsumerAffairs had received over 1,200 consumer reviews of PayPal, resulting in an overall satisfaction rating of one star out of five for the company. Consumers have also launched numerous anti-PayPal Facebook pages and Twitter accounts to air their complaints.

In February 2017, PayPal froze the account of News Media Canada, a Canadian trade association, in response to a payment from The Reminder, a Flin Flon, Manitoba community newspaper, intended to cover the fee for the Reminder's submission of articles for consideration in a nationwide journalism contest run by News Media Canada, including one discussing Syrian refugees. PayPal cited United States regulations as a reason for flagging the transaction between Canadian entities.

In September 2018, PayPal banned radio host Alex Jones and his website InfoWars, claiming that his site has content that was hateful and discriminatory against certain religious groups.

PayPal discontinued payments to Pornhub models on November 14, 2019, alleging that "Pornhub has made certain business payments through PayPal without seeking our permission". Pornhub criticized the decision as one that affected "over a hundred thousand performers who rely on them for their livelihoods", and steered its payees toward other payment options.

In September 2020, PayPal issued new terms of service which introduced a fee for inactive accounts in 19 countries. PayPal sent its clients an e-mail about the updated terms, but didn't mention introducing such a fee.

PayPal faced criticism over their policies related to changing the name on a user's account. Critics cited the complicated system involved in changing names, which require legal and government-issued identification. This system has been seen as impacting transgender users, who find trouble in using preferred names and pronouns.

In July 2021, PayPal announced a plan to collaborate with the Anti-Defamation League's Center on Extremism, the League of United Latin American Citizens, and several other nonprofits to analyze its users' transactions in order to investigate the finances of extremist and hate groups in the United States and share the results with law enforcement, policymakers, and other financial corporations; the ADL's CEO, Jonathan Greenblatt, stated that this initiative is meant to help "mitigat[e] extremist threats" and to "help disrupt those activities."

In May 2022, Branko Marcetic wrote in Jacobin magazine that PayPal had cancelled the accounts of a number of left-wing media sites and frozen their funds. PayPal gave no explanation for its action, but the article linked the cancellations with the media sites' criticism of US policy in relation to the Russian invasion of Ukraine. Consortium News, Mint Press News and journalist Alan MacLeod were mentioned as those whose accounts had been cancelled. Marcetic wrote that the freezing of Wikileaks' account over a decade earlier had provided a precedent for PayPal's action.

In September 2022, PayPal shut the accounts of the British social commentator Toby Young, and two connected organisations: the Free Speech Union and The Daily Sceptic website. PayPal said that the accounts were closed because of breaches its acceptable use policy, apparently because of alleged misinformation about COVID-19 vaccines. PayPal reversed the decision a few days later.

In October 2022, PayPal published an update to their acceptable use policy which included a $2,500 fine for the accounts of users PayPal deemed to have been promoting "misinformation". Former PayPal president David A. Marcus criticized the change, tweeting that "PayPal's new AUP goes against everything I believe in". Elon Musk, co-founder of X.com, which later merged with Confinity to form PayPal, also criticized the change. Following media scrutiny and criticism on social media, PayPal removed the updated policy from their website, stating: "An AUP notice recently went out in error that included incorrect information. PayPal is not fining people for misinformation and this language was never intended to be inserted in our policy. Our teams are working to correct our policy pages."

Litigation 

In March 2002, two PayPal account holders separately sued the company for alleged violations of the Electronic Funds Transfer Act (EFTA) and California law. Most of the allegations concerned PayPal's dispute resolution procedures. The two lawsuits were merged into one class-action lawsuit (In re: PayPal litigation). An informal settlement was reached in November 2003, and a formal settlement was signed on June 11, 2004. The settlement requires that PayPal change its business practices (including changing its dispute resolution procedures to make them EFTA-compliant), as well as making a US$9.25 million payment to members of the class. PayPal denied any wrongdoing.

In June 2003, Stamps.com filed a lawsuit against PayPal and eBay claiming breach of contract, breach of the implied covenants of good faith and fair dealing, and interference with contract, among other claims. In a 2002 license agreement, Stamps.com and PayPal agreed that Stamps.com technology would be made available to allow PayPal users to buy and print postage online from their PayPal accounts. Stamps.com claimed that PayPal did not live up to its contractual obligations and accused eBay of interfering with PayPal and Stamps.com's agreement, hence Stamps.com's reasoning for including eBay in the suit.

Craig Comb and two others filed a class action against PayPal in Craig Comb, et al. v. PayPal Inc.. They sued, alleging illegal misappropriation of customer accounts and detailed their customer service experiences, including freezing deposited funds for up to 180 days until disputes were resolved by PayPal. PayPal argued that the plaintiffs were required to arbitrate their disputes under the American Arbitration Association's Commercial Arbitration Rules. The court ruled against PayPal, stating that "the User Agreement and arbitration clause are substantively unconscionable under California law." Paypal agreed to pay $9.25 million as a result of the case.

In September 2002, Bank One Corporation sued PayPal for allegedly infringing its cardless payment system patents. The following year, PayPal countersued, claiming that Bank One's online bill-payment system was an infringement against PayPal's online bill-payment patent, issued in 1998. The two companies agreed on a settlement in October 2003.

In November 2003, AT&T Corporation filed suit against eBay and PayPal claiming that their payment systems infringed an AT&T patent, filed in 1991 and granted in 1994. The case was settled out of court the following month, with the terms of the settlement undisclosed.

In June 2011, PayPal and Israel Credit Cards-Cal Ltd. were sued for NIS 16 million. The claimants accused PayPal of deliberately failing to notify its customers that ICC-Cal was illegally charging them for currency conversion fees.

A class-action lawsuit filed in 2010 was settled in 2016, in which the plaintiffs contested PayPal's "holds" on funds. PayPal has proposed a settlement in the amount of $3.2 million in Zepeda v. PayPal which has yet to be ratified. As part of the settlement, the company agreed to change some of its policies.

CFPB consent 

On 21 May 2015, PayPal agreed that PayPal Credit would pay a $25 million fine to settle a complaint filed in Federal Court by the Consumer Financial Protection Bureau. The complaint alleged that consumers using PayPal were signed up for PayPal credit accounts without their knowledge nor consent. It alleged that PayPal had promised discounts and payment options the consumers never received, and that users trying to sign up for the regular, non-credit, PayPal accounts were signed up for credit accounts instead. The complaint was filed in the United States District Court for the District of Maryland, which ordered PayPal Credit to refund $15 million to consumers and to pay a $10 million fine.

See also 

Billpoint
E-commerce payment system
Electronic money
Interchange fee
List of online payment service providers
Micropayment
Payment service provider
PayPal Mafia
Paytm
Google Pay
Stripe (company)

References

External links

 

 
1998 establishments in California
American companies established in 1998
Financial services companies established in 1998
Internet properties established in 1998
2002 mergers and acquisitions
2002 initial public offerings
Companies based in San Jose, California
Corporate spin-offs
EBay
Electronic funds transfer
Financial technology companies
Foreign exchange companies
Mobile payments
Online payments
Payment systems
Payment service providers